Bill Ryan (27 July 1914 – 1 July 1966) was  a former Australian rules footballer who played with Footscray in the Victorian Football League (VFL).

Notes

External links 
		

1914 births
1966 deaths
Australian rules footballers from Victoria (Australia)
Western Bulldogs players
Yarraville Football Club players
South Bendigo Football Club players